A Deputy Governor of the Bank of England is the holder of one of a small number of senior positions at the Bank of England, reporting directly to the Governor. 

According to the original charter of 27 July 1694 the Bank's affairs would be supervised by a Governor, the Deputy Governor and 24 directors.  Since then, however, the role of Deputy Governor has been split and redefined three times (by the Bank of England Act 1998, the Financial Services Act 2012 and again in 2014), such that, as of May 2016, there are four Deputy Governors (Sir Jon Cunliffe, Ben Broadbent, Sam Woods and Sir David Ramsden). They have special responsibility for financial stability, monetary policy, prudential regulation and markets and banking respectively. In 2013, the position of Chief Operating Officer (COO) was created and has the same status and remuneration as a Deputy Governor.

Under Schedule 1 of the Bank of England Act 1998 (as amended), Deputy Governors are appointed for five year terms, and are term-limited to two terms.

Deputy Governors of the Bank of England (1694–present)

As sole occupant (1694–1998)

With specific responsibility (1998–present) 
The Bank of England Act 1998, which came into force on 1 June 1998, created a second Deputy Governorship. Clementi became Deputy Governor for Financial Stability for the rest of his term, and Mervyn King became the first Deputy Governor for Monetary Policy.

Chief operating officers
In June 2013, the position of chief operating officer (COO) of the Bank of England was created. The COO has responsibility for the day-to-day operations of the Bank. They have the same status and remuneration as a Deputy Governor.

See also
Chief Cashier of the Bank of England
Governor of the Bank of England

References

Bibliography 
 
 
 

Bank of England
England